Murdostoun is one of the twenty-one wards used to elect members of the North Lanarkshire Council. It elects four councillors and covers the settlements of Cleland, Dalziel Park and Newmains plus the Coltness and Cambusnethan areas of Wishaw, with a combined population of 20,485 in 2019; created in 2007, its territory remained almost unchanged in a 2017 national review, other than the addition of a few streets by moving a section of the boundary south from the Temple Gill burn to the edge of Belhaven Park.

Councillors

Election Results

2022 Election
2017: 2xLab; 1xSNP; 1xInd
2022: 2xLab; 1xSNP; 1xInd
2017-2022: No change

2017 Election
2017 North Lanarkshire Council election

2012 Election
2012 North Lanarkshire Council election
 

SNP councillor John Taggart resigned from the party and became Independent on 10 February 2015 in opposition to the party's 2015 Westminster Election selection procedures.

2007 Election
2007 North Lanarkshire Council election

References

Wards of North Lanarkshire
Wishaw